Komar-e Sofla (also Romanized as Komār-e Soflá, Komār Soflá, and Kamar Sofla; also known as  Kemar, Komār, Komār-e Pā’īn, Komār Pā’īn, Kūh Mar, and Qamar) is a village in Dizmar-e Gharbi Rural District, Siah Rud District, Jolfa County, East Azerbaijan Province, Iran. At the 2006 census, its population was 794, in 172 families.

References 

Populated places in Jolfa County